In enzymology, a 2-methyleneglutarate mutase is an enzyme that catalyzes the chemical reaction

2-methyleneglutarate  2-methylene-3-methylsuccinate

Hence, this enzyme has one substrate, 2-methyleneglutarate, and one product, 2-methylene-3-methylsuccinate.

This enzyme belongs to the family of isomerases, specifically those intramolecular transferases transferring other groups.  The systematic name of this enzyme class is 2-methyleneglutarate carboxy-methylenemethylmutase. This enzyme is also called alpha-methyleneglutarate mutase.  This enzyme participates in c5-branched dibasic acid metabolism.  It employs one cofactor, cobamide.

References

 
 

EC 5.4.99
Cobamide enzymes
Enzymes of unknown structure